The Hauptstrasse ("Main Street") is the central street of Heidelberg's old town, the Altstadt, running the full length of the quarter. Today, it is a pedestrianised zone and popular shopping street.

Route
Between Theaterstrasse and Universitätsplatz, there is a slight rise, which is caused by the alluvial fan of the now subterranean  stream. 
The street is around 1.8 km long. 
It is crossed by numerous streets running from north to south (mostly called Gassen, "alleys") and there are five squares along its route.

The street numbering starts at Bismarckplatz (in the west), with the uneven numbers on the north (left) side and the even numbers on the south (right) side. The highest number is 251. From 1856 until 1877, the Hauptstrasse was divided into western and eastern sections with separate numbering.

History

There was a road on the course of the current Hauptstrasse even before the foundation of Heidelberg in 1220, which was used as the central axis of the new city. In 1391, this street was named  ("Upper Alley"), in 1491  ("Big Street") and in 1508  ("Speyer Street"). It has borne the name , "Main Street" since 1689. City gates stood at the east and west ends of the street. Following the expansion of the city to the west in 1392, the graves outside the gate were dug up and the Hauptstrasse was extended.

After the destruction of Heidelberg in the War of the Palatine Succession in 1693, the city was rebuilt in the baroque style, but retaining the old streetplan. The Hauptstrasse retained its original course and width.

In 1885, the first Heidelberg horse-drawn tramline was opened, which ran on rails from the old train station at what is now Adenauerplatz along the Hauptstrasse to the Karlstor. A second horse was required for the light rise between Theaterstrasse and Universitätsplatz (then known as Ludwigsplatz). The horse-drawn trams were replaced with electric trams in 1902.

Under Mayor , the Hauptstrasse was modified and pedestrianised. In 1969, through-traffic was banned. From 6 November 1971, the western part up to Universitätsplatz was closed to all traffic on weekends. On 15 July 1972, the section from Universitätsplatz to Marktplatz was converted to a tram-only street and from 1 January 1974, it was also closed to all traffic on weekends. On 2 July 1975 and on 29 April 1976, the town council decided to convert most streets of the Altstadt into pedestrian zones. On 4 July of the same year, the trams were stopped and the tracks were covered with asphalt on 20 September; the powerlines for the trams were removed on 7 January 1977. The conversion to a pedestrian zone was completed on 30 September 1978.

Use 
Until its closure to through-traffic in 1969, the Hauptstrasse was an important route for motor traffic and a two-track tram. 
Since the completion of the conversion in 1978, the whole of the Hauptstrasse except for a short section between Kornmarkt and Karlstor is a pedestrian zone. It is by far the busiest shopping street in Heidelberg and the 43rd busiest in Germany as of 2013, with an average of 5618 people visiting it per hour over the period 2004 to 2013. In addition to the shops and restaurants, there are several significant institutions, like the Town Hall, the Kurpfälzisches Museum, and parts of the University.

Significant buildings

References

Bibliography

 Melanie Mertens, Landesamt für Denkmalpflege (ed): Denkmaltopographie Bundesrepublik Deutschland, Kulturdenkmale in Baden-Württemberg, Bd. II.5.1, Stadtkreis Heidelberg. Thorbecke-Verlag, Ostfildern, 2013, pp. 231–291. ISBN 978-3-7995-0426-3

Roads in Baden-Württemberg
Heidelberg